Joseph Widmer (15 August 1779 – 10 December 1844) was a Swiss Catholic theologian.  A native of Hohenrain, he died in Beromünster.

He studied philosophy at Lucerne, and theology at Landshut (1802-4) under Sailer and Zimmer, the former exercising a great and abiding influence over him. After ordination Widmer was appointed professor of philosophy in 1804, and of moral and pastoral theology in 1819 at the lyceum of Lucerne. In 1833 he was removed from his position by the Government and received a canonry in the collegiate chapter at Beromunster; in 1841 he became the provost of this chapter. In connection with Joseph Heinrich Aloysius Gügler Widmer did good service in opposing the teachings of Ignaz Heinrich von Wessenberg, and in reviving ecclesiastic life in Switzerland. Among his writings are: "Der katholische Seelsorger" (Munich, 1819–23); "Systematische Uebersicht der in Sailer's Handbuch der christlichen Moral ausführlich entwickelten and dargestellten Grundsätze" (Sarmenstorf, 1839); "Vortrage uber Pastoraltheologie" (Sarmenstorf, 1840). He edited the works of Sailer (Sulzbach, 1830–46), of Franz Geiger (Fluelen, 1823–39), and Gügler (Lucerne, 1828–40).

References

1779 births
1844 deaths
People from Hochdorf District
19th-century Swiss Roman Catholic theologians
Swiss philosophers